Hooked or Picnic is a 2008 film by Adrian Sitaru, set in Romania (original name: Pescuit sportiv, duration: 84 minutes). It is the story of a barbecue trip of a Romanian couple, which takes an unexpected turn when their car runs over a prostitute while driving through a forest near Bucharest. The incident throws a new light over the relationship of the two lovers, and shows how much change can come for human beings in a single day.

Cast 
 Adrian Titieni - Mihai
 Ioana Flora - Iubi
 Maria Dinulescu - Ana-Violeta
 Alexandru Georgescu - Van driver
 Sorin Vasilescu - Gamekeeper
 Nicodim Ungureanu - Ionut

See also
 Romanian New Wave

External links

Official website

2008 films
Romanian drama films
Films set in Romania